The 2016 Laguna Seca Superbike World Championship round was the ninth round of the 2016 Superbike World Championship. It took place over the weekend of 8–10 July 2016 at the Mazda Raceway Laguna Seca.

Championship standings after the round

Superbike Championship standings after Race 1

Superbike Championship standings after Race 2

External links
 Superbike Race 1 results
 Superbike Race 2 results

2016 Superbike World Championship season
Laguna Seca Superbike World Championship round
Laguna Seca